Paul Elderkin (born February 24, 1987 in England) was a professional basketball player for Durham Wildcats. He is currently playing for the Melbourne Tigers.

Honours and awards

 Player of the Year Division 3 2008/09
 Player of the Year Division 2 2009/10
 Eurobasket Domestic Player of the Year, Guard of the Year, 1st Team of the Year 2009/10
 Club MVP 2006-2009
 Club Best Defensive 2006-2010

References

Honours and Awards.

Profile.

References

1987 births
Living people
English men's basketball players